Oleg Vladimirovich Tabunov (born 18 September 1969) is a former Russian football player.

International career
He represented Soviet Union at the 1989 FIFA World Youth Championship.

External links
 

1969 births
Footballers from Moscow
Living people
Soviet footballers
Russian footballers
Association football defenders
FC Lokomotiv Moscow players
PFC CSKA Moscow players
FC Karpaty Lviv players
FC Santa Claus players
Russian expatriate footballers
Expatriate footballers in Finland